Janensch is a German surname. Notable people with the surname include:

Gerhard Janensch (1860–1933), German sculptor
Paul Janensch (born 1938), American journalist
Werner Janensch (1878–1969), German paleontologist and geologist

German-language surnames